Bernard Gérard may refer to:

Bernard Gérard (politician) (born 1953), member of the National Assembly of France
Bernard Gérard (intelligence officer), French intelligence officer
Bernard Gérard (composer) (1930–2000), French composer of film scores